Operation Pastorius was a failed German intelligence plan for sabotage inside the United States during World War II. The operation was staged in June 1942 and was to be directed against strategic American economic targets. The operation was named by Admiral Wilhelm Canaris, chief of the German Abwehr, for Francis Daniel Pastorius, the organizer of the first organized settlement of Germans in America. The plan involved eight German saboteurs who had previously spent time in the United States.

The plan quickly failed after two of the agents, George John Dasch and Ernest Peter Burger, defected to the Federal Bureau of Investigation shortly after being deployed, betraying the other six. A military tribunal – whose constitutionality was challenged to the Supreme Court in Ex parte Quirin – sentenced all eight to death later that year. President Franklin D. Roosevelt commuted the sentences of Dasch and Burger, who were pardoned conditional on their permanent deportation to the American occupation zone in Germany in 1948 by President Harry S. Truman.

Fourteen other people would be charged with aiding those in charge of the operation.

Background
After the Japanese attack on Pearl Harbor on 7 December 1941, followed by Germany's declaration of war on the United States four days later, and the United States' declaration of war on Germany in response, Hitler authorized a mission to sabotage the American war effort and attack civilian targets to demoralize the American civilian population inside the United States. The mission was given to Abwehr chief Admiral Wilhelm Canaris, the head of German military intelligence. During World War I he had organized the sabotage of French installations in Morocco, and that other German agents entered the United States to attack New York arms factories, including the destruction of munitions supplies at Black Tom Island, in 1916. He hoped that Operation Pastorius would have the same kind of success.

Agents
Recruited for Operation Pastorius were eight Germans who had lived in the United States. Two of them, Ernst Burger and Herbert Haupt, were American citizens. The others, George John Dasch, Edward John Kerling, Richard Quirin, Heinrich Harm Heinck, Hermann Otto Neubauer and Werner Thiel, had worked at various jobs in the United States. All eight were recruited into the Abwehr and were given three weeks of intensive sabotage training in the German High Command school on an estate at Quenzsee, near Berlin, Germany. The agents were instructed in the manufacture and use of explosives, incendiaries, primers, and various forms of mechanical, chemical and electrical delayed-timing devices. Considerable time was spent developing complete background "histories" they were to use in the United States. They were encouraged to converse in English and to read American newspapers and magazines to improve their English and familiarity with current American events and culture.

The team

Mission

Their mission was to sabotage American economic targets: hydroelectric plants at Niagara Falls; the Aluminum Company of America's plants in Illinois, Tennessee, and New York; locks on the Ohio River, near Louisville, Kentucky; Pennsalt Chemicals (then the Pennsylvania Salt Manufacturing Company) in Cornwells Heights (Bensalem), Pennsylvania; the Pennsylvania Railroad's Horseshoe Curve, a crucial railroad pass near Altoona, Pennsylvania, as well as their repair shops at Altoona; the Pennsalt cryolite (a raw material in the production of fluorene and aluminum) plant in Philadelphia; Hell Gate Bridge in New York; and Pennsylvania Station in Newark, New Jersey. The agents were also instructed to spread a wave of terror by planting explosives on bridges, railroad stations, water facilities, and public places. They were given counterfeit birth certificates, Social Security cards, draft deferment cards, nearly $175,000 in American money, and driver's licenses, and put aboard two U-boats to land on the east coast of the U.S.

Before the mission began it was in danger of being compromised as George Dasch, commander of the team, left confidential documents on a train, and one of the agents when drunk announced to patrons in a tavern in Paris that he was a secret agent.

On the night of 12 June 1942, the first submarine to arrive in the U.S., landed at Amagansett, New York, about 100 miles east of New York City on Long Island, at what is now Atlantic Avenue beach. It was carrying Dasch and three other saboteurs (Burger, Quirin, and Heinck). The team came ashore wearing German Navy uniforms so that, if they were captured, they would be classified as prisoners of war rather than spies. They also brought their explosives, primers and incendiaries, and buried them along with their uniforms, and put on civilian clothes to begin an expected two-year campaign in the sabotage of American defense-related production.

When Dasch was discovered amidst the dunes by unarmed Coast Guardsman John C. Cullen, Dasch offered Cullen a $260 bribe. Cullen feigned cooperation but reported the encounter. An armed patrol returned to the site but found only the buried equipment; the Germans had taken the Long Island Rail Road from the Amagansett station into Manhattan, where they checked into a hotel. A massive manhunt was begun.

The other four-member German team commanded by Kerling landed without incident at Ponte Vedra Beach, Florida, south of Jacksonville on 16 June 1942. This group came ashore wearing bathing suits, but wore German Navy hats. After landing ashore, they threw away their hats, put on civilian clothes, and started their mission by boarding trains to Chicago, Illinois and Cincinnati, Ohio.

The two teams were to meet on 4 July in a hotel in Cincinnati to coordinate their sabotage operations.

Betrayal
Dasch called Burger into their upper-story hotel room and opened a window, saying they would talk, and if they disagreed, "only one of us will walk out that door—the other will fly out this window." Dasch told him he had no intention of going through with the mission, hated Nazism, and planned to report the plot to the FBI. Burger agreed to defect to the United States immediately.

On 15 June, Dasch phoned the New York office of the FBI to explain who he was, but ended the call when the agent answering doubted his story. Four days later, he took a train to Washington, DC and walked into FBI headquarters, where he gained the attention of Assistant Director D.M. Ladd by showing him the operation's budget of $84,000 cash. None of the other six German agents were aware of the betrayal. During the next two weeks, Burger and the other six were arrested.  FBI Director J. Edgar Hoover did not mention that Dasch had surrendered himself, and claimed credit for the FBI for discovering the spy gang.

Trial and execution
Fearful that a civilian court would be too lenient, President Roosevelt issued Executive Proclamation 2561 on 2 July 1942 creating a military tribunal to prosecute the Germans. Placed before a seven-member military commission, the Germans were charged with the following offenses:

 Violating the law of war;
 Violating Article 81 of the Articles of War, defining the offense of corresponding with or giving intelligence to the enemy;
 Violating Article 82 of the Articles of War, defining the offense of spying; and
 Conspiracy to commit the offenses alleged in the first three charges.

The trial was held in Assembly Hall #1 on the fifth floor of the Department of Justice building in Washington D.C. on 8 July 1942. Lawyers for the accused, who included Lauson Stone and Kenneth Royall, attempted to have the case tried in a civilian court but were rebuffed by the United States Supreme Court in Ex parte Quirin, 317 U.S. 1 (1942), a case that was later cited as a precedent for the trial by military commission of any unlawful combatant against the United States.

The trial for the eight defendants ended on 1 August 1942. Two days later, all were found guilty and sentenced to death. Roosevelt commuted Burger's sentence to life in prison and Dasch's to 30 years because they had surrendered themselves and provided information about the others. The others were executed on 8 August 1942 in the electric chair on the third floor of the District of Columbia jail and buried in a potter's field in the Blue Plains neighborhood in the Anacostia area of Washington.

Aftermath
The failure of Operation Pastorius caused Hitler to rebuke Admiral Canaris and no sabotage attempt was ever made again in the United States. During the remaining years of the war, the Germans only once more dispatched agents to the United States by submarine. In November 1944, as part of Operation Elster, the German submarine U-1230 left two SS-Reichssicherheitshauptamt (Reich Security Main Office) spies on the coast of Maine to gather intelligence concerning American manufacturing and technical progress. After a month of high living in New York City, but no espionage gathering, one of the men turned himself into the FBI, which captured both agents soon afterward. Both were convicted and sentenced to death, with their executions stayed throughout the duration of the war, after which their punishment was commuted by President Truman into life sentences in prison.

In 1948, President Harry S. Truman granted executive clemency to Dasch and Burger on the condition that they be deported to the American occupation zone in Germany. In Germany they were regarded as traitors who had caused the death of their comrades. Dasch died in 1992 at the age of 89 in Ludwigshafen, Germany. Burger died in 1975.

Sometime during the 1960s or 1970s, the National Socialist White People's Party placed an unauthorized monument to the executed spies in a thicket in southwest Washington, D.C. on National Park Service land. It went largely unknown and ignored for several decades; the Park Service removed it during 2010.

See also
Duquesne Spy Ring in 1941
They Came to Blow Up America, a 1943 movie based on Operation Pastorius, featuring George Sanders.
Saboteur, a 1942 movie concerning acts of sabotage on the U.S. mainland during World War II.
The Ninth Man, a novel of the 1970s written by John Lee, fictional story of a ninth agent, who evaded capture.
 History of homeland security in the United States

References
Notes

Bibliography

Dobbs, Michael, Saboteurs: The Nazi Raid on America, New York: Knopf, 2004. 
Rachlis, Eugene, They Came to Kill: The Story of Eight Nazi Saboteurs in America, New York: Random House, 1961.
Persico, Joseph E., Roosevelt's Secret War: FDR and World War II Espionage, New York:Random House, 2001, pp. 199–205. 
Federal Bureau of Investigation: George John Dasch and the Nazi Saboteurs
Lippmann, David H., World War II Plus 55, June 10-13th, 1942
Montauk Life: The Night of the Nazis
Cornell University School of Law: Ex Parte Quirin (summary)
Samaha, Joel, et al. (eds.), Transcript of Proceedings before the Military Commission to Try Persons Charged with Offenses against the Law of War and the Articles of War, Washington D.C., 8 to 31 July 1942, Minneapolis: University of Minnesota, 2004. 
Abella, Alex & Gordon, Scott, Shadow Enemies: Hitler's Secret Terrorist Plot Against the United States, Guilford, CT: Lyons Press, 2002. 

Further information
The Facts Don't Matter An hour-long This American Life radio episode (original air date 3/12/2004) about the events leading up to Ex parte Quirin

External links

Amagansett U.S. Life-Saving & Coast Guard Station Museum
Six Nazi  Saboteurs Executed in Washington - Ghosts of DC history blog
 - a 1943 film about saboteurs, led by a German-American, landing on Long Island

1942 in the United States
World War II espionage
Economic warfare
United States military law
Pastorius
Pastorius
American Theater of World War II
United States home front during World War II
1942 in New York (state)
1942 in Florida
1942 in Washington, D.C.
Germany–United States relations
June 1942 events